WNXR (107.3 FM) is a radio station broadcasting a classic hits format. Licensed to Iron River, Wisconsin, the station is currently owned by Heartland Comm. License, LLC, and features programming from Westwood One. It serves Ashland and Bayfield counties, and has a rimshot signal to the Duluth area.

The studios are at 2320 Ellis Avenue in Ashland. The transmitter site is on Spider Lake Road, south of Iron River, Wisconsin.

References

External links

NXR